Weekend is the second studio EP of New Zealand band Young Lyre, released on 25 November 2015.

Background
In the 2011, the band released their first EP, title Night Swimming. After a long period of tour and festivals, the band started to produce their second EP. On 24 May 2014, the band started their crowd funding campaign to help funding their second EP. The campaign of $2,000 meet its goal on 21 February 2015 with the total of $2,135. The EP was officially released on 27 November 2015.

Singles
The first single from the album, was "We Go Faster" released on 10 May 2015. The music video to the video was crowdfunded alongside the album production. Also they received the help to fund the video and the album by a New Zealand project called NZ On Air.

Track listing

Personnel
Young Lyre
 Jordan Curtis – lead vocals, synths 
 Sanjay Bangs – guitar, synths
 Kiran Rai – guitar, synths 
 Simon Roots – drums, backing vocals
 Matt Judd – bass, backing vocals

Technical
 Greg Haver – producer on "We Go Faster", recording
 Simon Gooding – producer on "We Go Faster", mixing
 Nick Poortman – recording
 Joe LaPorta – mastering
 Winston Shacklock – Album art, layout

References

External links

2015 EPs
Young Lyre albums
Albums produced by Greg Haver